Aphaenopsis is a genus of beetles in the family Carabidae, containing the following species:

 Aphaenopsis apfelbecki Ganglbauer, 1891
 Aphaenopsis pfeiferi Apfelbeck, 1908

References

Trechinae